Badflower is an American rock band founded in Los Angeles, California. The band is composed of singer/guitarist Josh Katz, lead guitarist Joey Morrow, bass guitarist Alex Espiritu and drummer Anthony Sonetti. The band is signed to Big Machine / John Varvatos Records and was named Artist of the Week by Apple Music after the release of their EP Temper in 2016. Their debut studio album, OK, I'm Sick, was released on February 22, 2019. Their second album This Is How the World Ends was released on September 24, 2021.

History

Formation and indie label releases (2008–2014) 
Badflower's earliest incarnation, the Cartunes, formed in 2008, when music school students, Northridge CA born Josh Katz, and Gilroy CA transplant, Joey Morrow, met at their Hollywood CA apartment building. The pair moved in together, and began writing songs for their 5 piece band. They released a self produced EP in 2011 but after losing their bass player and rhythm guitarist, reformed as rock band Badflower, recruiting Espiritu and Sonetti to round out their ranks. They played several shows in Los Angeles including a weekly residency at The Key Club and gained attention from satellite radio personality and former NSYNC member Lance Bass. After a performance at The Troubadour, opening for Kongos, the band signed with former independent record label Hundred Handed and began recording their first music release.

Major label signing and Temper EP (2015–2016) 

Badflower released their debut single "Soap" via Hundred Handed records on March 4, 2015, and debuted its music video on Loudwire the same day. Shortly after the release the band flew to the United Kingdom to support Australian pop duo The Veronicas and played to sold out venues including London's Heaven. Then, upon returning home to the US, the band headed straight back on tour to play several showcases in Austin, TX for SXSW and South by So What?! in Grand Prairie, Texas supporting Circa Survive. A demo version of the band's song "Animal" was also used in record label executive John Varvatos's show during New York Fashion Week. The band was then flown out to New York City to showcase for Varvatos and head executives at Republic Records with the prospect of making a deal. After the performance, the label immediately began negotiations which included a buy-out from their previous deal with Hundred Handed.

Impatient with the negotiations, the band took it upon themselves to begin recording an album in their garage. On March 10 the band signed with John Varvatos / Republic Records. When the conversation about making an album began, the band confessed they had already begun making it in their garage and submitted a nearly complete version of "Temper" to the label. To the band's surprise, the label loved the self-produced collection and began preparing to release the unanimous favorite, "Animal," as the first single. "Animal" was premiered on Guitar World website and released on September 1, 2016. Following the release of the single, the band performed across the US in support of Billy Talent on the "Afraid of Heights" tour in September, 16. While on tour, the band gained attention from active rock radio stations and top programmers for iTunes and Apple Music.

The band's debut EP, Temper dropped on November 4, 2016 and Badflower was named Apple Music's Artist of the week. "Good, Old-Fashioned Rock n' Roll May Have Just Made a Modern Comeback," declares Nylon Magazine Active and Alternative rock radio began spinning "Animal" regularly and was added by stations such as SiriusXM Octane and was voted #1 on KROQ locals only for multiple weeks in a row. iTunes named "Animal" among the best rock songs and Temper among best rock albums of 2016. A few songs from Temper were also featured on Spotify's most streamed music playlists including New Music Friday Following the buzz, Badflower was asked to headline KCRW's School night in West Hollywood, CA on December 19, 2016. The band recruited friend and Big Bang Theory actor Johnny Galecki to join them on stage to close the show. On December 31 "Animal" entered into the Billboard Mainstream Rock Chart and peaked at number 28. In addition, by March 2017 their single "Animal" from Temper had cracked at 1 million Spotify streams and as of 2018 has garnered them over 2,000,000 streams. Soon after the release of Temper EP on December 12, 2016, Badflower began touring to promote the release.

Touring and debut studio album (2017–2020)
Badflower as well as American rock band Red Sun Rising would be opening acts for Pop Evil on their "Rock 'N' Roll Now" Tour from January to February 2017. After the tour, they would be the supporting bands with Bleeker and Beware of Darkness, as well as two additional shows with Red Sun Rising, playing at various music festivals like Buzzfest, Rock on Range and River City Rock Fest. They would also put on a summer tour with the rock group Goodbye June from Nashville, Tennessee, and In addition, it was announced they were to do several more headlines at major festivals like Louder Than Life Festival in Kentucky They have opened for Of Mice & Men, Greta Van Fleet, IDK, From Ashes to New, The Struts, Pop Evil, Bleeker, Beware of Darkness, The Wrecks, and Red Sun Rising

During the tour, a previously unreleased track, "Move Me", was released on the band's Facebook page. Katz explained he wrote the song while heartbroken at his Thousand Oaks, CA home in 2015. However, four days after the release of "Move Me", their tour van was broken into outside a venue in Los Angeles. Their backpacks, wallets, laptops, cameras, gear etc. were stolen and they were forced to cancel two shows in Santa Cruz and Berkeley, California. The tour reconvened soon after, and their track "White Noise", from their Temper EP, reached 1 million plays on Spotify.

On September 9, 2017 it was revealed on Facebook they were to start recording for their first full length album with their record label John Varvatos /Big Machine Label Group, being the first rock group to sign a deal with the label. Badflower began preproduction for the new album in Fall 2017 and began recording at Ocean Studios in Burbank, CA alongside producer Noah Shain. More than a year later, on December 6, 2018, the band re-released their official music video for the song "Heroin", featuring the current version of the song, which had been added to the album.

At the end of 2017, Badflower had over 1,000,000 fans from 61 countries playing over 312,000 hours of their music from their Spotify alone.

On November 1, Badflower announced their debut album OK, I'm Sick, would be released on February 22, 2019.

Josh Katz said the following about the single 'Ghost': "I was depressed and thinking about self-harm. So I just wrote it. I played out the whole scenario and put it into a song because that's what writers do, I suppose. I didn't even know if it was gonna go on the album. I was sorta hesitant to even show it to the rest of my band, But everyone heard it and loved it".

The group released a single called "30" on July 17, 2020, coinciding with Katz's 30th birthday. It features lyrics centered around reaching the milestone age of 30 years old and being uncomfortable with it.

This Is How the World Ends (2021–present)
On July 6, 2021, the band announced their second album, 
titled This Is How the World Ends. The singles "Family", "Don't Hate Me", "Fukboi", and "Johnny Wants To Fight" were released in that order leading up to the album's release on September 24. It was elected by Loudwire as the 38th best rock/metal album of 2021.

Discography

Studio albums

EPs
 About a Girl (2013)
 Temper (2016)

Singles

Music videos

References

External links

2013 establishments in California
American hard rock musical groups
American post-grunge musical groups
Big Machine Records artists
Hard rock musical groups from California
Musical groups established in 2013
Musical groups from Los Angeles
Rock music groups from California